Vincenzo "Enzo" Osella (born 26 August 1939) is the founder and chairman of Italian auto manufacturer Osella as well as former principal of the Osella Formula One team.

Life 
Enzo Osella was born in Volpiano, near Turin, to Luigi and Maria Osella. His parents ran a grocery store and a transport company in Volpiano until the end of the Second World War. After the war Luigi Osella took over a garage in the centre of Turin. Enzo Osella first job out of school was in a gravel plant. He then started helping his father at the garage by working on the customers' cars.

One of his father's regular client was an amateur rally driver who convinced Enzo to assist him as navigator. From 1957 Osella competed as navigator in several rally races, including the Sestriere Rally. Osella even attempted to participate as a driver by borrowing his sister's Fiat 600. He then purchased a Lotus 11, which he modified according to his own wishes and equipped with an Osca engine and an Alfa Romeo differential, and took part in hillclimb races.

His racing efforts not particularly successful, Osella in 1963 took a job with Carlo Abarth, who produced Fiat-based racing cars in Turin and also ran a motorsport team. Osella worked for Abarth as a test driver, gaining insight into chassis and engine production and tuning aspects. Osella also worked as a mechanic and driver supervisor for the Abarth racing team during this time.

At the end of 1964 Enzo Osella went into business for himself and took over an Abarth factory agency in Turin. In 1971 Carlo Abarth sold the name rights and production facilities to Fiat and retired to Vienna. Osella purchased the racing department, and started operating it under the name Osella Corse.

Osella's company is currently based in Verolengo. The team is still competing in sportcar and hillclimb races.

Personal life 
Enzo Osella is married and has two children, a boy and a girl. His son died in 1991.

References

External links 
 Short biography on the website www.grandprix.com
 Short biography on the website www.oldracingcars.com

1939 births
Living people
Italian motorsport people
Formula One team owners
Formula One team principals
Osella